Pilodeudorix mera, the streaked fairy playboy, is a butterfly in the family Lycaenidae. It is found in Ivory Coast, Nigeria, Cameroon, Gabon, the Republic of the Congo, Angola, the Democratic Republic of the Congo, Uganda, Rwanda, Tanzania and Zambia. The habitat consists of primary forests.

Subspecies
Pilodeudorix mera mera (Ivory Coast, Nigeria: east and the Cross River loop, Cameroon, Gabon, Congo, northern Angola, western Uganda, north-western Zambia, Democratic Republic of the Congo: Uele, Tshopo, Equateur, Kinshasa, Sankuru and Lualaba)
Pilodeudorix mera kinumbensis (Dufrane, 1945) (eastern Democratic Republic of the Congo, Uganda, Rwanda, north-western Tanzania)

References

External links
Die Gross-Schmetterlinge der Erde 13: Die Afrikanischen Tagfalter. Plate XIII 65 h

Butterflies described in 1873
Deudorigini
Butterflies of Africa
Taxa named by William Chapman Hewitson